Janet Mitchell may refer to:

 Janet Mitchell (EastEnders), a fictional character from the BBC soap opera EastEnders
 Janet Mitchell (artist) (1912–1998), Canadian artist
 Janet Mitchell (cricketer), former women's cricketer for the West Indies women's cricket team
 Janet L. Mitchell (born 1950), American physician
 Margaret Mitchell (Scottish politician), full name Janet Margaret Mitchell